The White Martians are one of four fictional extraterrestrial races native to Mars in the DC Comics' shared universe. White Martians, also known as Pale Martians, appear in the comics of the DC Universe, chiefly JLA, Martian Manhunter, and Son of Vulcan. They first appeared in Justice League #71 (May 1969).

History
As a race of shapeshifters, physical appearance has little meaning for Martians. The underlying psychological differences are what separated the peaceful Green Martians from the war-like Whites. White Martians have configured their physiology to reflect their philosophy, becoming a separate race from the Green and Yellow Martians. In the current DC continuity, their preferred form is that of angular, hairless humanoids with chalky white skin which often forms bony ridges or plates, giving them the appearance of armor. They have sometimes been seen to have a gaping mouth on their thorax and a horn on the same level on each side.

It was eventually retconned that the White Martians and Green Martians did not originally co-inhabit Mars together as was previously believed. In reality the green and white Martians were part of the same race, known as "The Burning". This race used fire to reproduce asexually and were belligerent to all. The Guardians of the Universe, fearing the ruthlessly and violently powerful Martians, genetically split the Martian race into two distinct species, white and green, preventing the asexual reproduction. They also gave these two new races an instinctive fear of fire to prevent either group from ever accessing their full potential, and altered their powers so one race could never completely overcome the other. The timeframe for this genetic tampering was given as 20,000 years ago, contemporary with the early life of Vandal Savage on Earth, in JLA series 2 #86.

While the Green Martians were peaceful philosophers, the White Martians were savage warriors. A lengthy civil war between the two races ended when the few surviving White Martians were rounded up and exiled to the extra-dimensional "Still Zone" (apparently distinct from Superman's Phantom Zone, in which they were later imprisoned again).

White Saturnians

White Saturnians called Koolars are descended from an underclass of worker clones created by ancient White Martian explorers. Green Martians cloned Jemm, Son of Saturn's people, the original Red Saturnians, from themselves, and the White Martians cloned the original White Saturnians from their own cells. The Reds were treated as equals by their creators, but the whites were treated as slaves by their masters. The enslavement of the white clones led to the civil war on Mars.

Hyperclan
The Hyperclan is a White Martian vanguard for an all-out takeover of Earth who masquerade as alien superheroes with the intent of displacing the JLA in the affections of the people of Earth. The Hyperclan members are known as Protex, Fluxus, A-Mortal, Züm, Primaid, Tronix, Armek and Zenturion, using the array of natural Martian powers to give each "hero" a seemingly different set of abilities; for example, Züm was a speedster, Armek was a massive armored figure with superhuman strength and could change color, and Fluxus was a shapeshifter. Their initial attack results in the destruction of the League's satellite and the death of Metamorpho and is preceded by a sickness that strikes all fire-based heroes and villains, such as Firehawk and Doctor Phosphorus, causing them to lose their powers. With the use of mind control and public relations, they nearly succeeded in brainwashing all of Earth into seeing the new Justice League as the villains, creating the illusion that the League were jealous of the Hyperclan's pro-active efforts to eliminate villains and improve crop development in formerly barren areas. Despite the heroes scoring some victories in later confrontations, such as the Flash knocking out Züm with a punch at near-lightspeed or Green Lantern taking out Armek by exploiting the fact that they thought his ring was still vulnerable to yellow, the Hyperclan eventually managed to capture all of the Justice League, keeping Superman tortured with a mental illusion of green kryptonite while trapping Wonder Woman, Flash, Green Lantern and Aquaman in the 'Flower of Wrath', a device that would kill the heroes in hideous agony when it closed, with Martian Manhunter having apparently decided to betray the others out of recognition of the fact that he would never be accepted.

However, Batman managed to evade capture after the Hyperclan shot down the Batplane by taking advantage of their belief that he wasn't a threat because he was only human, deducing their true natures by their unwillingness to investigate his crashed and burning Batplane. Sneaking into the Hyperclan's base, Batman knocked out one and then later three Hyperclan members by trapping them in a ring of fire. Putting the pieces together about the Hyperclan's true nature, Superman eventually managed to throw off the Kryptonite illusion and free the rest of the League, aided by J'onzz, who had in reality realized the Hyperclan's true nature when their base was revealed, pretending to betray the League and then posing as Armek to infiltrate the Hyperclan. After Superman issued a public broadcast to the world that warned them of the threat and the Hyperclan's weakness, the invaders were captured, and each of them was telepathically brainwashed by J'onzz and Aquaman to believe themselves to be human. Given strong mental blocks to inhibit their powers, the Martians assumed normal Earth lives all over the globe, although they were kept under observation by the League.

Sabotage of Evolution

In JLA series 2 #4, Hyperclan leader Protex tells Superman how his people first came to Earth "long before there was human life" - and performed genetic experiments on terrestrial animals which crippled the evolutionary potential of the human race. The result: "the creatures which could have been gods ended up just...humans". The implication is that humans should have been, literally, a race of supermen, instead of such frail, limited creatures when compared to Martians. This was another reason for the war between the White and Green Martians, who were outraged by such biological vandalism. According to the storylines in Martian Manhunter (#25 - 27) by John Ostrander, and Son of Vulcan (#5), the genetic potential for a future metagene was discovered in ancient human DNA by the White Martian race. The White Martians performed experiments on these primitive humans, changing the metagene. Due to their experimentations, they actually altered the destiny of the human race. Whereas before evolution would have eventually made mankind into a race of superhumans similar to the Daxamites and Kryptonians, or the Martians themselves, now only a select few humans would be able to develop metahuman powers. As punishment for this, the group of renegades known as the Hyperclan was exiled to the Still Zone, a version of the Phantom Zone.

The Bruce Wayne Martian
On subsequent occasions, the White Martians succeeded in breaking free of their psychological imprisonment. The first time, a single White Martian briefly believed itself to be Bruce Wayne due to the trauma of being caught in a flaming plane crash which erased the memory of its original human identity of a Wayne Enterprises employee; having been assigned a role as Wayne's secretary in order to keep a close eye on him, the Martian studied Wayne's schedule and assumed that he was Wayne. While the rest of the League kept an eye on the other Martians in case the renegade tried to 'wake them up', the Wayne Martian was defeated by a team consisting of Green Lantern, Steel, Big Barda, Orion and Plastic Man (selected because they didn't know Batman's identity and thus they wouldn't 'tip' the telepathic Martian off to the fact that he was a fake), Orion deliberately setting himself on fire to attack the Martian until Green Lantern threw a car onto the Martian to knock it out. The Martian programming was subsequently restored and the heroes made certain that the other Martians remained brainwashed, although Batman expressed some concern about their current strategy with the Martians.

Terror Incognita
The whole race was later revived after the battle with the wish-granting Id; J'onn's wish was to be reunited with his human self — the League having been divided into their superhuman and civilian identities after a careless wish made by Superman — was subconsciously translated as a desire to cure his loneliness, and thus prompting Id, in its usual sense of irony, to awaken those on Earth most like J'onn. This time, the White Martians captured various human psychics to work on means of expanding their own mental abilities while simultaneously constructing chemical processing towers which would fireproof Earth's atmosphere by binding all the free oxygen, making themselves completely invulnerable, and conveniently asphyxiating mankind into extinction. Although the towers were destroyed when J'onn escaped his imprisonment, the League were forced to trick the Martians into sending them to the Phantom Zone to come up with a plan of attack; the Zone was the one place Martian telepathy couldn't reach, allowing them to conceive a plan of attack and then return to Earth, J'onn placing a mental block on their minds that would stop them from remembering the plan - and thus giving the White Martians a chance to learn about it - until the moment came for them to take action. Released by the Atom (who had hidden inside Protex's head to use his own telepathy against him), the League faced the Martians in a climactic battle on the Moon. The plan required Superman, Wonder Woman, and Green Lantern to move the Moon itself to expose the Martians to flame by dragging it into Earth's atmosphere, J'onn keeping the Martians occupied while Atom manipulated Protex's telepathy to make the other White Martians believe that their fellows were the League members, Earth's magicians working to negate the damage that would have otherwise been caused to Earth by the lunar gravity. Placed in this position, the Martians were forced to accept being banished into the Phantom Zone — a common punishment for DC's most dangerous super-villains — or die on the Moon. J'onn was prepared to sacrifice his own life to defeat them, but was teleported out of danger at the last second by his teammates, Batman subsequently informing him that he was never alone, and that J'onn having considered himself such was the one thing that his teammates couldn't easily forgive.

Metavirus
The White Martians created a metavirus, a metagene that could be passed from host to host via touch. This metavirus was responsible for the empowerment of the very first Son of Vulcan. The Sons of Vulcan passed the metavirus down in an unbroken line from then onwards, sworn to hunt and kill "the pale ones", i.e., the White Martians.

White Martian Hybrids

With the help of Funky Flashman, an oviparous White Martian named A'monn A'mokk creates five human-Martian hybrid children named Sapling, Buster, Silhouette, Quaker and Blur, using superhuman DNA from unrevealed sources. The five hybrids all have a latent fear of fire. Sapling resembled Poison Ivy in powers and costume, and Buster seemed like a cross between Bizarro and Solomon Grundy. Silhouette seemed to be wearing a variant of Nightshade's old costume and had similar powers. Blur is an albino teenager wearing an altered form of the Reverse Flash's costume.

The Burning

When the Martian Manhunter overcame his fear of fire, he broke the ancient genetic block and released Fernus, a member of the primeval Martian race. In the JLA story arc "Trial by Fire", an ancient Burning Martian entity called "Fernus" - the manifestation of J'onn's racial memory of the Martians' original race identity - took possession of J'onn J'onzz and exterminated as many members of the White Martian race as he could find. Fernus infiltrated the Phantom Zone by telepathically stealing Superman's access codes and travelling to the Fortress of Solitude before the League could open the Zone and try to question a White Martian about Fernus. Fernus is eventually defeated by Plastic Man in a last desperate confrontation.

Miss Martian

Miss Martian, the White Martian known as M'gann M'orzz, is a member of the Teen Titans during the year between the events depicted in Infinite Crisis and the One Year Later stories. At first, she pretends to be a Green Martian, until she is exposed by Bombshell. In her Earth form, M'orzz has green skin, shoulder-length red hair dresses in a mini-skirt version of Martian Manhunter's outfit, and uses the Earth name "Megan Morse".

Martian Manhunter miniseries
In this miniseries, several beings that appeared to be Green Martians were found alive on Earth. They were eventually revealed to be White Martians, under mind control and disguised as Greens; a Green Martian named "Cay'An" had brainwashed them to believe they were Green Martians. All of the White Martians had been killed in one way or another before the series' end, except for a juvenile named Till'All. Till'All became friends with J'onn J'onzz, and was introduced to the Justice League at the end of the story.

Brightest Day
In the Brightest Day storyline, Martian Manhunter states that there are no other White Martians, although Till'All and Miss Martian are still in existence.

Powers and abilities
Like the Green Martians, White Martians have numerous superhuman powers, including great strength/speed, flight, invisibility, telepathy, shape-changing, phase-shifting (sometimes called variable density) which allows them to be either invulnerably tough or completely immaterial, and "Martian vision", but they also share the Green Martians' vulnerability to fire. One of the White Martians disguised himself as the Hyperclan member Zum and had superspeed, though not on the level of the Flash. In Teen Titans vol.3 #41, Miss Martian was shown quickly recovering from the effects of Bombshell's neural scrambling powers as well as reforming after (apparently) having her head shot off. She was also shown in this appearance breaking a pair of handcuffs by waving her hand near them.

The phase-shifting ability is not depicted in their first post-Crisis appearance. Also, their power of flight initially seemed limited to within an atmosphere: a White Martian is defeated by Wonder Woman after succumbing to asphyxiation in outer space; however, the White Martians are later shown flying from Earth to the moon apparently without technological assistance and fighting the JLA in a vacuum.

Known White Martians
 A-Mortal - A White Martian member of Hyperclan with a frightful appearance. 
 A'Monn A'Mokk - A White Martian who fought Son of Vulcan. 
 A'Morr - A White Martian who is the wife of A'Monn A'Mokk. 
 Armek - A White Martian member of Hyperclan who posed as a large robotic hero. 
 Buster - A White Martian who is the son of A'Monn A'Mokk and A'Morr, the brother of Quaker, and the sister of Silhouette. 
 Blur - A White Martian analog to the Flash created by the species and Funky Flashman. 
 Commander Blanx - A White Martian overlord. 
 Dal'en - A White Martian who was brainwashed.
 Fluxus - A super-strong White Martian and member of Hyperclan who posed as a shapeshifting hero. 
 Martian Man-Eater - A White Martian monster created by Malefic from Black Martian magic in order to fight Martian Manhunter. 
 Micha'kel - A White Martian who was brainwashed.
 Miss Martian - A White Martian member of the Teen Titans. She appears in other media, such as Supergirl and Young Justice, often masquerading as a Green Martian.
 Primaid - A White Martian who is the second-in-command of the Hyperclan. 
 Protex - A White Martian who is the leader of the Hyperclan. 
 Quaker - A White Martian who is the son of A'Monn A'Mokk and A'Morr, the brother of Buster, and the sister of Silhouette. 
 Silhouette - A White Martian who is the daughter of A'Monn A'Mokk and A'Morr and the sister of Buster and Quake. 
 Sy'rann - A White Martian who was brainwashed.
 Telok'tellar - A White Martian who was brainwashed.
 Till'all - A White Martian who is friends with Martian Manhunter. 
 Tronix - A White Martian and member of Hyperclan who posed as a superhero with flight and eye beams. 
 Z'Kran Z'Rann - A White Martian that became one of the First Seven Green Lanterns. 
 Zenturion - A White Martian who is a member of Hyperclan. 
 Züm - A White Martian and member of Hyperclan who posed as a superhero with super-speed. 
 M'Comm M'orzz / Ma'alefa'ak - He is a White Martian in Batman: The Brave and the Bold comics and in the third season of Young Justice.

In other media

Television

Live action
The White Martians made their first appearance in the Supergirl episode "Strange Visitor From Another Planet". One of the White Martians posed as Senator Miranda Crane (portrayed by Tawny Cypress) in order to seek out and kill J'onn J'onnz (who was posing as Hank Henshaw on Earth). J'onn wanted to kill the unnamed White Martian as payback for the White Martians' mass genocide of his race, including his family, but Supergirl stopped J'onn from going through with it because it would make him as murderous as the White Martians. After the unnamed White Martian is captured, it tells Kara that there are millions more ready to attack. In the episode "Myriad" the unnamed White Martian that posed as Miranda Crane was under the custody of the D.E.O. when Non raided the facility, he mind-controlled Lucy Lane into releasing its inmates except for the unnamed White Martian. M'gann M'orzz appears in the second season. She is hiding her real identity of a White Martian from Martian Manhunter by posing as a last surviving female Green Martian. She was ultimately forced to expose her true identity via a blood donation in order to save J'onn after the latter was left critically injured in a fight with Parasite, with J'onn eventually imprisoning her after learning about her status as a White Martian. However, he later forgives her and also defends her after learning that a psychic attack was made on her by the other White Martians on Earth. Armak later appeared, as the mate for M'gann, who was significantly brutal even by White Martian standards, with M'gann ultimately returning to Mars in the hopes of finding other White Martians that can embrace means other than war. By the end of the second season, M'gann reveals that there is a secret party within the White Martians' society who share her ideologies. At the end of season three episode "Triggers" M'gann calls J'onn to come on Mars where, in "Far From the Tree", has a resistance army of White Martians. They show him that his father M'yrnn is alive and that he was coerced by villainous White Martians to reveal the location of Staff of Kolar, the psychic weapon believed to be a key to end a war. After J'onn finally convinces his father that he is truly his son and not a White Martian, J'onn, Supergirl and M'gann resistance army defeat the villainous White Martians and retrieve the Staff of Kolar, but Till'all convinces J'onn to take the weapon on Earth so it cannot be taken on enemy's hands while M'gann resistance army continues to fight against their oppressors on Mars. The captured White Martian in D.E.O. appears briefly in the third-season episode, "In Search of Lost Time", during telepathic breakdown caused by J'onn's father M'yrnn when other alien prisoners attempt to escape; the White Martian was stopped by J'onn. Another White Martian appears in the fifth season episode "Stranger Beside Me" as an assistant to Green Martian, Malefic J'onzz (who wants to get revenge on his brother J'onn J'onzz) and is presumably killed in combat with Supergirl.

Animation
 In the pilot episode of Justice League titled "Secret Origins", Earth is invaded by parasitic beings similar to the White Martians, but with a different background and appearance. The name "White Martian" is never used, as these beings did not really originate from Mars, have their own language and their shapeshifting powers were parasitically stolen from the Green Martian race when they conquered them. They are led by a being called the Imperium (voiced by an uncredited Kevin Michael Richardson). Their organic war machines are similar to the tripods from The War of the Worlds. When the Imperium aliens invaded Mars, virtually the entire populace was wiped out. J'onn J'onzz, the only survivor, managed to place them in suspended animation for a thousand years until Earth astronaut J. Allen Carter (voiced by Gary Cole) unknowingly released them. The Imperium aliens took the form of humans to infiltrate Earth, notably as Carter, who became a congressman, then attempted to take it over. They were defeated by dispersing the protective clouds they had created to block out the sun, as sunlight is deadly to their species. The rest fled into deep space and are never heard from again in the series.
 In the Batman: The Brave and the Bold episode "Rise of the Blue Beetle!", a White Martian can be seen among the pirate crew of Kanjar Ro.
 A creature that looks like a White Martian appears in a psychic montage of scenes in the Young Justice episode "Bereft" during Miss Martian's mind meld with Superboy. The White Martians are described as a minority treated like a second-class by the Green majority. Miss Martian is later revealed to be a White Martian when she is later confronted with Psimon. After she revealed to the team her true form, they do not show any signs of rejection, and Superboy is revealed to have known since the aforementioned mind meld in "Bereft".

Film
The White Martians are featured in the animated film Justice League: Crisis on Two Earths. During his stay with the Justice League on the Crime Syndicate's parallel Earth, J'onn J'onnz safeguarded First Daughter Rose Wilson. When Rose felt connected to J'onn, she attempted to kiss him, J'onn responded to show her "how Martians used to kiss", which is a telepathic exchange where he showed his history on Mars to her which showed him battling White Martians, and earlier images such as J'onn startling Dr. Erdel, and the League fighting Starro.

Video games
The White Martians appear in the Justice League Heroes video game with their leader voiced by Steven Blum. Brainiac had Killer Frost launch a nuclear missile to release the White Martians from their imprisonment. In this continuity, the White Martians are responsible for the genocide that killed off the Martian Manhunter's race.

Miscellaneous
The White Martians appear in issue #18 of Batman: The Brave and the Bold (which is based on Batman: The Brave and the Bold). Batman teams up with Martian Manhunter in order to fight the White Martians and keep them from invading Earth.

See also
 Mapinguari – creature from Brazilian folklore usually depicted with a similar mouth on its abdomen

References

External links
 Alan Kistler's Profile On: The Martian Manhunter
 Cosmic Teams: The Hyperclan
 Comicology: History of the Martian Manhunter part 3
 Cosmic Teams: DCU History & Chronology 1 Year Ago
 The DC Comics Martian History & Rehistory
 DCU Guide: JLA #1
 DCU Guide: History of the DCU
 DCU Guide: White Martians
 DCU Guide: The Burning

Characters created by Grant Morrison
DC Comics alien species
DC Comics characters who are shapeshifters
DC Comics characters with accelerated healing
DC Comics characters with superhuman senses
DC Comics characters with superhuman strength
DC Comics telepaths
DC Comics telekinetics 
DC Comics characters who have mental powers
Fictional Martians
Fictional characters who can turn intangible
Fictional characters who can turn invisible
Fictional characters with X-ray vision
Fictional characters who can stretch themselves
Fictional characters with density control abilities
Fictional characters with energy-manipulation abilities
Fictional characters with fire or heat abilities 
Fictional characters with slowed ageing
Fictional warrior races
Fictional illusionists 
Fictional empaths